Rahimahullah is a phrase often used after mentioning the righteous Islamic persons who lived after the companions of Muhammad.  The mention of a late male teacher, scholar, leader, or even a relative who was known for his goodness can be followed by the praying of mercy upon him. The equivalent phrase in referring to a woman is rahimahallah.

References 
Arabic words and phrases
Islamic honorifics